

Events

Pre-1600
63 BC – Cicero gives the fourth and final of the Catiline Orations.
 633 – Fourth Council of Toledo opens, presided over by Isidore of Seville.
1033 – The Jordan Rift Valley earthquake destroys multiple cities across the Levant, triggers a tsunami and kills many.
1082 – Ramon Berenguer II, Count of Barcelona is assassinated, most likely by his brother, Berenguer Ramon II.
1408 – Seeking to resubjugate Muscovy, Emir Edigu of the Golden Horde reaches Moscow, burning areas around the city but failing to take the city itself.
1456 – The first of two earthquakes measuring  7.2 strikes Italy, causing extreme destruction and killing upwards of 70,000 people.
1484 – Pope Innocent VIII issues the Summis desiderantes affectibus, a papal bull that deputizes Heinrich Kramer and Jacob Sprenger as inquisitors to root out alleged witchcraft in Germany.
1496 – King Manuel I of Portugal issues a decree ordering the expulsion of Jews from the country.
1560 – Thirteen-year-old Charles IX becomes king of France, with Queen Mother Catherine de' Medici as regent.
1578 – Sir Francis Drake, after sailing through Strait of Magellan, raids Valparaiso.

1601–1900
1649 – The town of Raahe is founded by Count Per Brahe the Younger.
1757 – Seven Years' War: Battle of Leuthen: Frederick II of Prussia leads Prussian forces to a decisive victory over Austrian forces under Prince Charles Alexander of Lorraine.
1766 – In London, auctioneer James Christie holds his first sale.
1775 – At Fort Ticonderoga, Henry Knox begins his historic transport of artillery to Cambridge, Massachusetts.
1776 – Phi Beta Kappa, the oldest academic honor society in the U.S., holds its first meeting at the College of William & Mary.
1831 – Former U.S. President John Quincy Adams takes his seat in the House of Representatives.
1847 – Jefferson Davis is elected to the U.S. Senate.
1848 – California Gold Rush: In a message to the United States Congress, U.S. President James K. Polk confirms that large amounts of gold had been discovered in California.
1865 – Chincha Islands War: Peru allies with Chile against Spain.
1895 – New Haven Symphony Orchestra of Connecticut performs its first concert.

1901–present
1914 – The Imperial Trans-Antarctic Expedition began in an attempt to make the first land crossing of Antarctica.
1919 – Ukrainian War of Independence: The Polonsky conspiracy is suppressed and its participants are executed by the Kontrrazvedka.
1921 – The Football Association bans women's football in England from league grounds, a ban that stays in place for 50 years.
1933 – The Twenty-first Amendment to the United States Constitution is ratified.
1934 – Abyssinia Crisis: Italian troops attack Wal Wal in Abyssinia, taking four days to capture the city.
1935 – Mary McLeod Bethune founds the National Council of Negro Women in New York City.
1936 – The Soviet Union adopts a new constitution and the Kirghiz Soviet Socialist Republic is established as a full Union Republic of the USSR.
1941 – World War II: In the Battle of Moscow, Georgy Zhukov launches a massive Soviet counter-attack against the German army.
  1941   – World War II: Great Britain declares war on Finland, Hungary and Romania.
1943 – World War II: Allied air forces begin attacking Germany's secret weapons bases in Operation Crossbow.
1945 – Flight 19, a group of TBF Avengers, disappears in the Bermuda Triangle.
1952 – Beginning of the Great Smog in London. A cold fog combines with air pollution and brings the city to a standstill for four days. Later, a Ministry of Health report estimates 4,000 fatalities as a result of it.
1955 – The American Federation of Labor and the Congress of Industrial Organizations merge and form the AFL–CIO.
  1955   – E. D. Nixon and Rosa Parks lead the Montgomery bus boycott.
1958 – Subscriber Trunk Dialling (STD) is inaugurated in the United Kingdom by Queen Elizabeth II when she speaks to the Lord Provost in a call from Bristol to Edinburgh.
  1958   – The Preston By-pass, the UK's first stretch of motorway, opens to traffic for the first time. (It is now part of the M6 and M55 motorways.)
1964 – Vietnam War: For his heroism in battle earlier in the year, Captain Roger Donlon is awarded the first Medal of Honor of the war.
  1964   – Lloyd J. Old discovers the first linkage between the major histocompatibility complex (MHC) and disease—mouse leukemia—opening the way for the recognition of the importance of the MHC in the immune response.
1971 – Battle of Gazipur: Pakistani forces stand defeated as India cedes Gazipur to Bangladesh.
1977 – Egypt breaks diplomatic relations with Syria, Libya, Algeria, Iraq and South Yemen. The move is in retaliation for the Declaration of Tripoli against Egypt.
1983 – Dissolution of the Military Junta in Argentina.
1991 – Leonid Kravchuk is elected the first president of Ukraine.
1995 – Sri Lankan Civil War: Sri Lanka's government announces the conquest of the Tamil stronghold of Jaffna.
  1995   – Azerbaijan Airlines Flight 56 crashes near Nakhchivan International Airport in Nakhchivan, Azerbaijan, killing 52 people.
2005 – The Civil Partnership Act comes into effect in the United Kingdom, and the first civil partnership is registered there.
2005 – The 6.8  Lake Tanganyika earthquake shakes the eastern provinces of the Democratic Republic of the Congo with a maximum Mercalli intensity of X (Extreme), killing six people.
2006 – Commodore Frank Bainimarama overthrows the government in Fiji.
2007 – Westroads Mall shooting: Nineteen-year-old Robert A. Hawkins kills nine people, including himself, with a WASR-10 at a Von Maur department store in Omaha, Nebraska.
2013 – Militants attack a Defense Ministry compound in Sana'a, Yemen, killing at least 56 people and injuring 200 others.
2014 – Exploration Flight Test 1, the first flight test of Orion, is launched.
  
2017 – The International Olympic Committee bans Russia from competing at the 2018 Winter Olympics for doping at the 2014 Winter Olympics.

Births

Pre-1600
 852 – Zhu Wen, Chinese emperor (d. 912)
1377 – Jianwen Emperor of China (d. 1402)
1389 – Zbigniew Oleśnicki, Polish cardinal and statesman (d. 1455)
1443 – Pope Julius II (d. 1513)
1470 – Willibald Pirckheimer, German lawyer and author (d. 1530)
1495 – Nicolas Cleynaerts, Flemish philologist and lexicographer (d. 1542)
1537 – Ashikaga Yoshiaki, Japanese shōgun (d. 1597)
1539 – Fausto Sozzini, Italian theologian and author (d. 1604)
1547 – Ubbo Emmius, Dutch historian and geographer (d. 1625)
1556 – Anne Cecil, Countess of Oxford, English countess (d. 1588)
1596 – Henry Lawes, English composer (d. 1662)

1601–1900
1661 – Robert Harley, 1st Earl of Oxford and Earl Mortimer, English lawyer and politician, Secretary of State for the Northern Department (d. 1724)
1666 – Francesco Scarlatti, Italian violinist and composer (d. 1741)
1687 – Francesco Geminiani, Italian violinist and composer (d. 1762)
1697 – Giuseppe de Majo, Italian organist and composer (d. 1771)
1782 – Martin Van Buren, American lawyer and politician, 8th President of the United States (d. 1862)
1784 – George Shepherd, English illustrator and painter (d. 1862)
1803 – Fyodor Tyutchev, Russian poet and diplomat (d. 1873)
1820 – Afanasy Fet, Russian poet and author (d. 1892)
1822 – Elizabeth Cabot Agassiz, American philosopher and academic, co-founded Radcliffe College (d. 1907)
1829 – Henri-Gustave Joly de Lotbinière, French-Canadian lawyer and politician, 4th Premier of Quebec (d. 1908)
1830 – Christina Rossetti, English poet and author (d. 1894)
1839 – George Armstrong Custer, American general (d. 1876)
1841 – Marcus Daly, Irish-American businessman (d. 1900)
1849 – Eduard Seler, German anthropologist, ethnohistorian, linguist, and academic (d. 1922)
1855 – Clinton Hart Merriam, American zoologist, ornithologist, entomologist, and ethnographer (d. 1942)
1859 – John Jellicoe, 1st Earl Jellicoe, English admiral and politician, 2nd Governor-General of New Zealand (d. 1935)
1861 – Konstantin Korovin, Russian-French painter and set designer (d. 1939)
1862 – John Henry Leech, English entomologist (d. 1900)
1863 – Paul Painlevé, French mathematician and politician, 84th Prime Minister of France (d. 1933)
1866 – John Beresford, Irish polo player (d. 1944)
  1866   – Traian Demetrescu, Romanian poet and author (d. 1896)
1867 – Antti Aarne, Finnish author and academic (d. 1925)
  1867   – Józef Piłsudski, Polish field marshal and politician, 15th Prime Minister of Poland (d. 1935)
1868 – Arnold Sommerfeld, German physicist and academic (d. 1951)
1869 – Ellis Parker Butler, American author and poet (d. 1937)
1870 – Vítězslav Novák, Czech composer and educator (d. 1949)
1872 – Harry Nelson Pillsbury, American chess player (d. 1906)
1875 – Arthur Currie, Canadian general (d. 1933)
1879 – Clyde Vernon Cessna, American pilot and businessman, founded the Cessna Aircraft Corporation (d. 1954)
1881 – René Cresté, French actor and director (d. 1922)
1886 – Rose Wilder Lane, American journalist and author (d. 1968)
  1886   – Pieter Oud, Dutch historian, academic, and politician, Minister of Finance of the Netherlands (d. 1968)
  1886   – Nikolai Uglanov, Soviet politician (d. 1937)
1890 – David Bomberg, English painter, illustrator, and academic (d. 1957)
  1890   – Fritz Lang, Austrian-American director, producer, and screenwriter (d. 1976)
1891 – Paul Kogerman, Estonian chemist and academic (d. 1951)
1894 – Charles Robberts Swart, South African lawyer and politician, 1st State President of South Africa (d. 1982)
1895 – Elbert Frank Cox, American mathematician and academic (d. 1969)
1896 – Ann Nolan Clark, American historian, author, and educator (d. 1995)
  1896   – Carl Ferdinand Cori, Czech-American biochemist and pharmacologist, Nobel Prize laureate (d. 1984)
1897 – Nunnally Johnson, American director, producer, and screenwriter (d. 1977)
  1897   – Gershom Scholem, German-Israeli philosopher and historian (d. 1982)
1898 – Josh Malihabadi, Indian-Pakistani poet and translator (d. 1982)
  1898   – Grace Moore, American soprano and actress (d. 1947)
1900 – Jimmy Dimmock, English footballer (d. 1972)

1901–present
1901 – Walt Disney, American animator, director, producer, and screenwriter, co-founded The Walt Disney Company (d. 1966)
  1901   – Milton H. Erickson, American psychiatrist and author (d. 1980)
  1901   – Werner Heisenberg, German physicist and academic, Nobel Prize laureate (d. 1976)
1902 – Emeric Pressburger, Hungarian-English director, producer, and screenwriter (d. 1988)
  1902   – Strom Thurmond, American educator, general, and politician, 103rd Governor of South Carolina (d. 2003)
1903 – Johannes Heesters, Dutch-German actor and singer (d. 2011)
  1903   – C. F. Powell, English-Italian physicist and academic, Nobel Prize laureate (d. 1969)
1905 – Gus Mancuso, American baseball player, coach, and sportscaster (d. 1984)
  1905   – Otto Preminger, Austrian-American actor, director, and producer (d. 1986)
  1905   – Francisco Javier Arana, Guatemalan Army colonel and briefly Guatemalan head of state (d.1949)
1907 – Lin Biao, Chinese general and politician, 2nd Vice Premier of the People's Republic of China (d. 1971)
  1907   – Giuseppe Occhialini, Italian-French physicist and academic (d. 1993)
1910 – Abraham Polonsky, American director and screenwriter (d. 1999)
1911 – Władysław Szpilman, Polish pianist and composer (d. 2000)
1912 – Sonny Boy Williamson II, American singer-songwriter and harmonica player (d. 1965)
  1912   – Kate Simon, American travel writer (d. 1990)
1913 – Esther Borja, Cuban soprano and actress (d. 2013)
1914 – Hans Hellmut Kirst, German lieutenant and author (d. 1989)
1916 – Hilary Koprowski, Polish-American virologist and immunologist, created the world's first effective live polio vaccine (d. 2013)
  1916   – Walt McPherson, American basketball player and coach (d. 2013)
1917 – Ken Downing, English racing driver (d. 2004)
1919 – Alun Gwynne Jones, Baron Chalfont, English historian and politician (d. 2020)
1921 – Alvy Moore, American actor and producer (d. 1997)
1922 – Casey Ribicoff, American philanthropist (d. 2011)
  1922   – Don Robertson, American songwriter and pianist (d. 2015) 
1924 – Robert Sobukwe, South African banker and politician (d. 1978)
1925 – Anastasio Somoza Debayle, Nicaraguan politician, 73rd President of Nicaragua (d. 1980)
1926 – Adetowun Ogunsheye, first female Nigerian professor and university dean
1927 – Bhumibol Adulyadej, Thai king (d. 2016)
  1927   – W.D. Amaradeva, Sri Lankan musician and composer (d. 2016)
1929 – Madis Kõiv, Estonian physicist, philosopher, and author (d. 2014)
1930 – Yi-Fu Tuan, Chinese-American geographer (d. 2022)
1931 – Ladislav Novák, Czech footballer and manager (d. 2011)
1932 – Alf Dubs, Baron Dubs, British politician
  1932   – Sheldon Glashow, American physicist and academic, Nobel Prize laureate
  1932   – Jim Hurtubise, American race car driver (d. 1989)
  1932   – Little Richard, American singer-songwriter, pianist, and actor (d. 2020)
  1932   – Nadira, Indian actress (d. 2006)
1933 – Gennadiy Agapov, Russian race walker (d. 1999)
  1933   – Harry Holgate, Australian politician, 36th Premier of Tasmania (d. 1997)
1934 – Joan Didion, American novelist and screenwriter (d. 2021)
1935 – Calvin Trillin, American novelist, humorist, and journalist
  1935   – Yury Vlasov, Ukrainian-Russian weightlifter and politician (d. 2021)
1936 – James Lee Burke, American journalist, author, and academic
1938 – J. J. Cale, American singer-songwriter and guitarist (d. 2013) 
1940 – Tony Crafter, Australian cricket umpire
  1940   – Boris Ignatyev, Russian footballer and manager
  1940   – Peter Pohl, Swedish author, director, and screenwriter
  1940   – Frank Wilson, American singer-songwriter and producer (d. 2012)
1942 – Bryan Murray, Canadian ice hockey coach (d. 2017)
1943 – Eva Joly, Norwegian-French judge and politician
  1943   – Andrew Yeom Soo-jung, South Korean cardinal
1944 – Jeroen Krabbé, Dutch actor, director, and producer
1945 – Serge Chapleau, Canadian cartoonist
  1945   – Moshe Katsav, Iranian-Israeli educator and politician, 8th President of Israel
1946 – José Carreras, Spanish tenor and actor
  1946   – Andy Kim, Canadian pop singer-songwriter
  1946   – Sarel van der Merwe, South African racing driver
1947 – Rudy Fernandez, Filipino triathlete
  1947   – Bruce Golding, Jamaican lawyer and politician, 8th Prime Minister of Jamaica
  1947   – Tony Gregory, Irish activist and politician (d. 2009)
  1947   – Jügderdemidiin Gürragchaa, Mongolian cosmonaut and military leader
  1947   – Jim Messina, American singer-songwriter, guitarist, and producer 
  1947   – Jim Plunkett, American football player and radio host
  1947   – Kim Simmonds, Welsh blues-rock singer-songwriter, guitarist, and producer
  1947   – Don Touhig, Welsh journalist and politician
1948 – Denise Drysdale, Australian television host and actress
1949 – John Altman, English composer and conductor
  1949   – David Manning, English civil servant and diplomat, British Ambassador to the United States
1951 – Link Byfield, Canadian journalist and author (d. 2015)
  1951   – Anne-Mie van Kerckhoven, Belgian painter and illustrator
1953 – Gwen Lister, South African-Namibian journalist, publisher, and activist
1954 – Hanif Kureishi, English author and playwright
  1954   – Gary Roenicke, American baseball player and scout
1955 – Miyuki Kawanaka, Japanese singer
  1955   – Juha Tiainen, Finnish hammer thrower (d. 2003)
1956 – Klaus Allofs, German footballer and manager
  1956   – Adam Thorpe, French-English author, poet, and playwright
  1956   – Krystian Zimerman, Polish virtuoso pianist
1957 – Raquel Argandoña, Chilean model, actress, and politician
  1957   – Art Monk, American football player
  1958   – Dynamite Kid, English wrestler (d. 2018)
1959 – Lee Chapman, English footballer
  1959   – Oleksandr Yaroslavsky, Ukrainian businessman 
1960 – Frans Adelaar, Dutch footballer and manager
  1960   – Osvaldo Golijov, Argentinian-American composer and educator
  1960   – Jack Russell, American singer-songwriter and producer 
  1960   – Matthew Taylor, English businessman and politician
1961 – Ralf Dujmovits, German mountaineer
  1961   – Laura Flanders, British journalist
1962 – José Cura, Argentinian tenor, conductor, and director
  1962   – Pablo Morales, American swimmer and coach
  1962   – Nivek Ogre, Canadian singer-songwriter 
  1962   – Fred Rutten, Dutch footballer and manager
1963 – Doctor Dré, American television and radio host
  1963   – Carrie Hamilton, American actress and playwright (d. 2002)
  1963   – Alberto Nisman, Argentinian lawyer (d. 2015)
1964 – Martin Vinnicombe, Australian cyclist
1965 – Manish Malhotra, Indian fashion designer
  1965   – John Rzeznik, American singer-songwriter, guitarist, and producer 
  1965   – Wayne Smith, Jamaican rapper (d. 2014)
  1965   – Valeriy Spitsyn, Russian race walker
1967 – Gary Allan, American singer-songwriter and guitarist
1968 – Margaret Cho, American comedian, actress, producer, and screenwriter
  1968   – Lisa Marie, American model and actress
  1968   – Lydia Millet, American novelist
  1968   – Falilat Ogunkoya, Nigerian sprinter
1969 – Eric Etebari, American actor, director, and producer
  1969   – Morgan J. Freeman, American director, producer, and screenwriter
  1969   – Sajid Javid, British Pakistani banker and politician, Chancellor of the Exchequer
  1969   – Lewis Pugh, English swimmer and lawyer
  1969   – Ramón Ramírez, Mexican footballer 
1970 – Kevin Haller, Canadian ice hockey player
  1970   – Michel'le, American singer-songwriter 
1971 – Karl-Theodor zu Guttenberg, German businessman and politician, German Federal Minister of Defence
  1971   – Ashia Hansen, American-English triple jumper
  1971   – Gabriel Hjertstedt, Swedish golfer 
1972 – Cliff Floyd, American baseball player and sportscaster
  1972   – Mike Mahoney, American baseball player
  1972   – Duane Ross, American hurdler and coach
1973 – Argo Arbeiter, Estonian footballer
  1973   – Arik Benado, Israeli footballer
  1973   – Mikelangelo Loconte, Italian singer-songwriter, producer, and actor
  1973   – Luboš Motl, Czech physicist and academic
1974 – Ravish Kumar, Indian journalist and author
  1974   – Brian Lewis, American sprinter
1975 – Ronnie O'Sullivan, English snooker player and radio host
  1975   – Paula Patton, American actress
1976 – Amy Acker, American actress
  1976   – Xavier Garbajosa, French rugby player
  1976   – Norishige Kanai, Japanese doctor and astronaut
  1976   – Sachiko Kokubu, Japanese actress and model
  1976   – Rachel Komisarz, American swimmer and coach
1977 – Peter van der Vlag, Dutch footballer
1978 – Neil Druckmann, American video game designer and author
  1978   – Olli Jokinen, Finnish ice hockey player
  1978   – Marcelo Zalayeta, Uruguayan footballer
1979 – Matteo Ferrari, Italian footballer
  1979   – Niklas Hagman, Finnish ice hockey player
  1979   – Gareth McAuley, Northern Irish footballer
1980 – Ibrahim Maalouf, Lebanese-French trumpet player and composer
  1980   – Jessica Paré, Canadian actress
1982 – Eddy Curry, American basketball player
  1982   – Keri Hilson, American singer-songwriter and actress
1985 – Shikhar Dhawan, Indian cricketer
  1985   – Frankie Muniz, American actor, drummer, and race car driver
  1985   – Danny Wicks, Australian rugby league player
1986 – LeGarrette Blount, American football player
  1986   – James Hinchcliffe, Canadian Indycar racing driver 
  1986   – Justin Smoak, American baseball player
1988 – Joanna Rowsell, English cyclist
1989 – Jurrell Casey, American football player
1989   – Kwon Yu-ri, South Korean singer-songwriter and actress
1990 – Montee Ball, American football player
1991 – Jacopo Sala, Italian footballer
  1991   – Christian Yelich, American baseball player
1992 – Ilja Antonov, Estonian footballer
  1992   – Natalie Sourisseau, Canadian field hockey player
1993 – Ross Barkley, English footballer
1994 – Ondrej Duda, Slovak footballer
1995 – Danny Levi, New Zealand rugby league player
  1995   – Anthony Martial, French footballer
  1995   – Kaetlyn Osmond, Canadian figure skater
1997 – Maddie Poppe, American singer-songwriter and musician

Deaths

Pre-1600
63 BC – Publius Cornelius Lentulus Sura, Roman politician (b. 114 BC)
 334 – Li Ban, emperor of Cheng Han (b. 288)
 902 – Ealhswith, queen consort and wife of Alfred the Great, King of Wessex
1082 – Ramon Berenguer II, Count of Barcelona (b. 1053)
1212 – Dirk van Are, bishop and lord of Utrecht
1244 – Joan, Countess of Flanders and Hainault(b. 1199 or 1200)
1355 – John III, Duke of Brabant (b. 1300)
1560 – Francis II of France (b. 1544)
1570 – Johan Friis, Danish politician (b. 1494)

1601–1900
1624 – Gaspard Bauhin, Swiss botanist and physician (b. 1560)
1654 – Jean François Sarrazin, French author and poet (b. 1611)
1663 – Severo Bonini, Italian organist and composer (b. 1582)
1749 – Pierre Gaultier de Varennes, sieur de La Vérendrye, Canadian commander and explorer (b. 1685)
1758 – Johann Friedrich Fasch, German violinist and composer (b. 1688)
1770 – James Stirling, Scottish mathematician and surveyor (b. 1692)
1784 – Phillis Wheatley, Senegal-born slave, later American poet (b. 1753)
1791 – Wolfgang Amadeus Mozart, Austrian composer and musician (b. 1756)
1819 – Friedrich Leopold zu Stolberg-Stolberg, German poet and lawyer (b. 1750)
1870 – Alexandre Dumas, French novelist and playwright (b. 1802)
1887 – Eliza R. Snow, American poet and songwriter (b. 1804)
1891 – Pedro II of Brazil (b. 1825)

1901–present
1918 – Schalk Willem Burger, South African commander, lawyer, and politician, 6th President of the South African Republic (b. 1852)
1925 – Władysław Reymont, Polish novelist, Nobel Prize laureate (b. 1867)
1926 – Claude Monet, French painter (b. 1840)
1931 – Vachel Lindsay, American poet (b. 1879)
1940 – Jan Kubelík, Czech violinist and composer (b. 1880)
1941 – Amrita Sher-Gil, Hungarian-Pakistani painter (b. 1913)
1942 – Jock Delves Broughton, English captain (b. 1883)
1946 – Louis Dewis, Belgian-French painter and educator (b. 1872)
1951 – Shoeless Joe Jackson, American baseball player and manager (b. 1887)
  1951   – Abanindranath Tagore, Indian painter, author, and academic (b. 1871)
1953 – William Sterling Parsons, American admiral (b. 1901)
1955 – Glenn L. Martin, American pilot and businessman, founded the Glenn L. Martin Company (b. 1886)
1961 – Emil Fuchs, German-American lawyer and businessman (b. 1878)
1963 – Karl Amadeus Hartmann, German composer and educator (b. 1905)
  1963   – Huseyn Shaheed Suhrawardy, Indian-Pakistani lawyer and politician, 5th Prime Minister of Pakistan (b. 1892)
1964 – V. Veerasingam, Sri Lankan educator and politician (b. 1892)
1965 – Joseph Erlanger, American physiologist, neuroscientist, and academic Nobel Prize laureate (b. 1874)
1968 – Fred Clark, American actor (b. 1914)
1969 – Claude Dornier, German engineer and businessman, founded Dornier Flugzeugwerke (b. 1884)
  1969   – Princess Alice of Battenberg (b. 1885)
1973 – Robert Watson-Watt, Scottish engineer, invented the radar (b. 1892)
1975 – Constance McLaughlin Green, American historian and author (b. 1897)
1977 – Katherine Milhous, American author and illustrator (b. 1894)
  1977   – Aleksandr Vasilevsky, Russian marshal and politician, Minister of Defence for the Soviet Union (b. 1895)
1979 – Jesse Pearson, American actor, singer, and screenwriter (b. 1930)
1983 – Robert Aldrich, American director, producer, and screenwriter (b. 1918)
1984 – Cecil M. Harden, American politician (b. 1894)
1986 – Edward Youde, Welsh-Chinese sinologist and diplomat, 26th Governor of Hong Kong (b. 1924)
1989 – John Pritchard, English conductor and director (b. 1921)
1990 – Alfonso A. Ossorio, Filipino-American painter and sculptor (b. 1916)
1994 – Harry Horner, Czech-American director, producer, and production designer (b. 1910)
1995 – L. B. Cole, American illustrator and publisher (b. 1918)
  1995   – Charles Evans, English mountaineer, surgeon, and educator (b. 1918)
  1995   – Gwen Harwood, Australian poet and playwright (b. 1920)
  1995   – Clair Cameron Patterson, American scientist (b. 1922)
1997 – Eugen Cicero, Romanian-German jazz pianist (b. 1940)
1998 – Albert Gore, Sr., American lawyer and politician (b. 1907)
2001 – Franco Rasetti, Italian-American physicist and academic (b. 1901)
2002 – Roone Arledge, American sportscaster and producer (b. 1931)
  2002   – Ne Win, Burmese general and politician, 4th President of Burma (b. 1911)
2005 – Edward L. Masry, American lawyer and politician (b. 1932)
2006 – David Bronstein, Ukrainian-Belarusian chess player and theoretician (b. 1924)
2007 – Andrew Imbrie, American composer and academic (b. 1921)
  2007   – George Paraskevaides, Greek-Cypriot businessman and philanthropist, co-founded Joannou & Paraskevaides (b. 1916)
  2007   – Karlheinz Stockhausen, German composer and academic (b. 1928)
2008 – Patriarch Alexy II of Moscow (b. 1929)
  2008   – George Brecht, American chemist and composer (b. 1926)
  2008   – Nina Foch, Dutch-American actress (b. 1924)
  2008   – Beverly Garland, American actress and businesswoman (b. 1926)
  2008   – Anca Parghel, Romanian singer-songwriter and pianist (b. 1957)
2009 – William Lederer, American soldier and author (b. 1912)
2010 – Alan Armer, American director, producer, and screenwriter (b. 1922)
  2010   – Don Meredith, American football player, sportscaster, and actor (b. 1938)
2011 – Peter Gethin, English racing driver (b. 1940)
  2011   – Gennady Logofet, Russian footballer and manager (b. 1942)
2012 – Dave Brubeck, American pianist and composer (b. 1920)
  2012   – Elisabeth Murdoch, Australian philanthropist (b. 1909)
  2012   – Oscar Niemeyer, Brazilian architect, designed the United Nations Headquarters and Cathedral of Brasília (b. 1907)
  2012   – Ignatius IV of Antioch, Syrian patriarch (b. 1920)
2013 – Fred Bassetti, American architect and academic, founded Bassetti Architects (b. 1917)
  2013   – William B. Edmondson, American lawyer and diplomat, United States Ambassador to South Africa (b. 1927)
  2013   – Nelson Mandela, South African lawyer and politician, 1st President of South Africa, Nobel Prize laureate (b. 1918)
2014 – Ernest C. Brace, American captain and pilot (b. 1931)
  2014   – Fabiola, Queen of Belgium (b. 1928)
  2014   – Talât Sait Halman, Turkish poet, translator, and historian (b. 1931)
  2014   – Jackie Healy-Rae, Irish hurdler and politician (b. 1931)
  2014   – Silvio Zavala, Mexican historian and author (b. 1909)
2015 – Vic Eliason, American clergyman and radio host, founded VCY America (b. 1936)
  2015   – Tibor Rubin, Hungarian-American soldier, Medal of Honor recipient (b. 1929)
  2015   – Chuck Williams, American businessman and author, founded Williams Sonoma (b. 1915) 
2016 – Tyruss Himes ("Big Syke"), American rapper (b. 1968)
2017 – Michael I of Romania, fifth and last king of Romania (b. 1921)
  2017   – August Ames, Canadian American pornographic actress (b. 1994)
2019 – Robert Walker, American actor (b. 1940)
2020 – Peter Alliss, English professional golfer (b. 1931) 
2021 – Bob Dole, American politician (b. 1923)
2022 – Kirstie Alley, American actress and producer (b. 1951)

Holidays and observances
Christian feast day:
Abercius
Clement of Alexandria (Episcopal Church)
Crispina
Dalmatius of Pavia
Gerbold
Justinian of Ramsey Island
Nicetius (Nizier)
Pelinus of Brindisi
Sabbas the Sanctified
December 5 (Eastern Orthodox liturgics)
Children's Day (Suriname)
Day of Military Honour - Battle of Moscow (Russia)
Discovery Day (Haiti and Dominican Republic)
International Volunteer Day for Economic and Social Development
Klozum (Schiermonnikoog, Netherlands)
Saint Nicholas' Eve (Belgium, Czech Republic, Slovakia, the Netherlands, Hungary, Romania, Germany, Poland and the UK)
Krampusnacht (Austria)
The King Bhumibol Adulyadej Memorial Birthday (Thailand) 
World Soil Day

References

External links

 BBC: On This Day
 
 Historical Events on December 5

Days of the year
December